Muhammad Daniel Wafiuddin bin Sa'dun (born 16 March 1997) is a Malaysian professional footballer who plays as a goalkeeper for Malaysia Super League club Sri Pahang.

Club career

Sri Pahang
Having previously played for Sri Pahang youth team. Daniel has been promoted to the first team in 2016.

Daniel joined Sri Pahang for a second stint after his contract with UKM expired  in December 2019.

On 21 August 2021, Daniel made his debut for the club during league match in 0–2 defeat to Kuala Lumpur City.

UKM
On 4 February 2019, Daniel made his competitive debut for UKM in their Malaysia Premier League match against Perlis. The club won by 2-1.

References

External links
 

1997 births
Living people
People from Pahang
Malaysian footballers
Sri Pahang FC players
UKM F.C. players
Malaysia Premier League players
Malaysia Super League players
Association football goalkeepers